Matelea parvifolia is a species of flowering plant in the family Apocynaceae known by the common names spearleaf . It is native to the southwestern United States and northern Mexico, where it grows in and on the edges of deserts. The flowers appear in the leaf axils. They are purplish or brownish green in color with a nub at each inner corner of the corolla lobes.

External links
Jepson Manual Treatment
USDA Plants Profile
Photo gallery

parvifolia
Flora of the Southwestern United States
Flora of Northwestern Mexico
Plants described in 1859